The Sjønstå Hydroelectric Power Station ( or Sjønstå kraftstasjon) is a hydroelectric power station in the municipality of Fauske in Nordland county, Norway. The plant is a river power station without its own reservoir. It also draws water from the Tverr River and one stream intake. It is owned by Salten Kraftsamband and came into operation in 1983. The plant reuses water that was previously utilized by the Lomi and  Fagerli hydroelectric power stations.

See also

References

Hydroelectric power stations in Norway
Fauske
Energy infrastructure completed in 1993
1983 establishments in Norway